Contactin-2 is a protein that in humans is encoded by the CNTN2 gene.

Function 

The protein encoded by this gene is a member of the immunoglobulin superfamily. It is a glycosylphosphatidylinositol (GPI)-anchored neuronal membrane protein that functions as a cell adhesion molecule. It may play a role in the formation of axon connections in the developing nervous system. It may also be involved in glial tumorigenesis and may provide a potential target for therapeutic intervention.

Interactions 

CNTN2 has been shown to interact with CNTNAP2 and NFYB.

References

External links

Further reading